Jehucal or Jucal (Hebrew יְהוּכַל Yəhūḵal) is a Hebrew name referring to a particular person in the Hebrew Bible (or Old Testament in the Christian Bible). Using the biblical source Jeremiah 37:3 he would have lived around the late 7th century to early 6th century BC.

Biblical accounts
Jehucal is only  mentioned in chapters 37 and 38 of the Book of Jeremiah:

Jeremiah 37:3
And Zedekiah the king sent Jehucal the son of Shelemiah, and Zephaniah the son of Maaseiah the priest, to the prophet Jeremiah, saying: 'Pray now unto the LORD our God for us' 

Jeremiah 38:1
 Now Shephatiah the son of Mattan, Gedaliah the son of Pashhur, Jucal the son of Shelemiah, and Pashhur the son of Malchiah heard the words that Jeremiah had spoken to all the people, saying

Archeology
Excavations conducted by the Ir David Foundation in the City of David uncovered a bulla (clay seal) bearing his name in 2005. It read yhwkl bn šlmyhw bn šby: Yehukal son of Shelemyahu son of Shebi.

References

6th-century BCE Jews